John Dillon    was an American professional baseball player who played in one game for the 1875 St. Louis Red Stockings. His brother Packy Dillon also played for the Red Stockings.

External links

St. Louis Red Stockings players
19th-century baseball players
Major League Baseball shortstops
Baseball players from Missouri